Kohei Yamamoto may refer to:

, Japanese football player
, Japanese cross-country mountain biker
, Japanese swimmer
, Japanese actor